Megalothrips is a genus of thrips in the family Phlaeothripidae.

Species
 Megalothrips andrei
 Megalothrips bonannii
 Megalothrips curvidens
 Megalothrips delmasi
 Megalothrips picticornis
 Megalothrips roundus
 Megalothrips schuhi
 Megalothrips spinosus

References

Phlaeothripidae
Thrips
Thrips genera